Owen Lewis may refer to:

 Owen Lewis (rugby league) (born 1988), Welsh rugby league player
 Owen Lewis (bishop) (1532–1594), Welsh Roman Catholic jurist, administrator, diplomat and bishop

See also
 Lewis Owen (disambiguation)
 Henry Owen Lewis (1842–1913), Irish Member of Parliament for Carlow Borough 1874–80